Shooting at the 2000 Summer Paralympics consisted of twelve events spread over two main classes:
 Class SH 1 - Pistol and rifle competitors who don't require a shooting stand
 Class SH 2 - Rifle competitors who require a shooting stand due to disability in the upper limbs

Medal table

Participating nations

Medallists

References 
 

2000 Summer Paralympics events
2000
Paralympics
Shooting competitions in Australia